Sitochroa concoloralis is a moth in the family Crambidae. It was described by Julius Lederer in 1857. It is found in Lebanon.

References

Moths described in 1857
Pyraustinae